Hotevilla-Bacavi (Hopi: Hotvela-Paaqavi; also known as Third Mesa) is a census-designated place (CDP) in Navajo County, Arizona, United States, on the Hopi Reservation.  The population was 957 at the 2010 census.

History

Hotevilla was first settled by the "hostiles", a group of Hopi residents who were forced out of nearby Oraibi in the 1906 Oraibi Split due to ideological differences over European cultural influences by recently arrived settlers, soldiers and missionaries, influences against which the hostiles were opposed. Later attempts to reintegrate displaced residents resulted in another split to the settlement of Bacavi, which later joined with Hotevilla to create a unified settlement.  Hotevilla is mentioned by D. H. Lawrence in his Mornings in Mexico travel memoir. The English author visited Hotevilla and Hopi country in 1924.

Geography

Hotevilla-Bacavi is located at  (35.922929, -110.665621).

Demographics

At the 2000 census there were 767 people, 246 households, and 181 families in the CDP. The racial makeup of the CDP was 96.0% Native American, 3.8% White, and 0.2% from two or more races.  1.0% of the population were Hispanic or Latino of any race.
Of the 246 households 34.6% had children under the age of 18 living with them, 41.1% were married couples living together, 28.9% had a female householder with no husband present, and 26.4% were non-families. 24.4% of households were one person and 8.9% were one person aged 65 or older.  The average household size was 3.12 and the average family size was 3.72.

The age distribution was 31.0% under the age of 18, 9.0% from 18 to 24, 24.8% from 25 to 44, 22.7% from 45 to 64, and 12.5% 65 or older.  The median age was 35 years. For every 100 females, there were 90.8 males.  For every 100 females age 18 and over, there were 83.0 males.

The median household income was $13,750 and the median family income  was $18,500. Males had a median income of $12,174 versus $19,095 for females. The per capita income for the CDP was $5,975.  About 58.9% of families and 69.4% of the population were below the poverty line, including 78.2% of those under age 18 and 41.4% of those age 65 or over.

Education
Hotevilla-Bacavi is a part of the Cedar Unified School District. White Cone High School serves Hotevilla-Bacavi.

Notable person 
 Charles Loloma (1921–1991), Hopi jeweler
 Ralph Tawangyawma (1894-1973), Hopi jeweler & Political activist
 Helen Sekaquaptewa (1898-1990), Hopi storyteller

References

Census-designated places in Navajo County, Arizona
Hopi
Hopi Reservation
Populated places established in 1906
1906 establishments in Arizona Territory